Devil is the second compilation of the trilogy released by Babes in Toyland. It was produced by Tim Mac, and released May 2000 by Almafame.

Track listing
All songs by Babes in Toyland (except Tracks 13, 14 and 15)

"Oh Yeah" (recorded at Reading Festival; 1995)
"Spun" (recorded at Lollapolooza San Francisco; June 22, 1993)
"Bruise Violet" (recorded at Lollapolooza San Francisco; June 22, 1993)
"Primus" (recorded at Utrecht, Netherlands)
"Fake Fur Condom" (recorded at Minneapolis Paisley Park; September 16, 1992)
"Won't Tell" (recorded at Lollapolooza San Francisco; June 22, 1993)
"Magic Flute" (recorded at Amsterdam Melkweg; September 16, 1992)
"S.F.W." (recorded at Amsterdam Melkweg; July 8, 1994)
"Jungle Train" (recorded at Amsterdam Melkweg; July 8, 1994)
"Knife Song" (recorded at Minneapolis 7th Street Entry; February 25, 1988)
"Flesh Crawl" (recorded at Minneapolis 7th Street Entry; February 25, 1988)
"Intermenstral" (recorded at Minneapolis 7th Street Entry; February 25, 1988)
"We Are Family" (recorded at Reading Festival; 1995)
"More, More, More" (demo)
"Calling Occupants of Interplanetary Craft" (demo)
Multimedia
16. Babes in Toyland Photo Album

Trivia
The official version of More, More, More is on Spirit of '73: Rock for Choice and Calling Occupants Of Interplanetary Craft is on If I Were a Carpenter

Personnel
Kat Bjelland - Guitar, vocals
Lori Barbero - drums, vocals on Tracks 4 and 13
Maureen Herman - Bass on Tracks 1-9, 13, 14, and 15
Michelle Leon - Bass on Tracks  10, 11, and 12

References

Babes in Toyland (band) compilation albums
2000 compilation albums